This is map and list of European countries by Gross national income (PPP) per capita for year 2020 from World Bank. Countries in green have more than $32,000, yellow $18,000-$32,000 and red below $18,000 GDP (PPP) per capita

See also
International organisations in Europe 
List of European countries by budget revenues
List of European countries by budget revenues per capita
List of European countries by GDP (nominal) per capita
List of European countries by GDP (PPP) per capita 
List of European countries by GNI (nominal) per capita 
List of sovereign states in Europe by net average wage
List of countries by GDP (nominal) per capita
List of countries by GDP (nominal)
List of countries by GDP (PPP)
List of countries by GNI (PPP) per capita

References

GNI PPP
GNI PPP, Europe
Europe GNI
Economy of Europe-related lists